Robert Herland (3 November 1909 – 10 March 1984) was a French wrestler. He competed in the men's freestyle heavyweight at the 1936 Summer Olympics.

References

1909 births
1984 deaths
French male sport wrestlers
Olympic wrestlers of France
Wrestlers at the 1936 Summer Olympics
Place of birth missing